Oliver "Daddy" Warbucks is a fictional character from the comic strip Little Orphan Annie and Dick Tracy. He made his first appearance in the New York Daily News in the Annie strip on September 27, 1924. In the series he is said to be around 52 years of age.

Biography

Childhood
Warbucks was born about 1894, near the fictional small town of Supine. (In Thomas Meehan's 1980 novelisation of his 1977 musical, he was born and brought up in Hell's Kitchen, New York, and is 52 years old as of 1933, thus giving him a birthdate of 1881. In the 1982 film, he says he was born in Liverpool, England.) His father, a section boss on the railway, was killed when he was a month old. His mother was left with only "gumption" and a house in which she was able to keep boarders. His early youth in Supine involved cornering all the marbles in town at age nine, serving as a messenger for the telegraph company, having a girlfriend named Millie, fishing, swimming and raiding melon patches with Spike Spangle and beating up the son of the banker who planned to foreclose on his mother's house. Then on June 7, 1905, when he was 11 years old, his mother died at age 30, of typhoid. On the night of the funeral he was put on the outbound Limited. Presumably he later spent some time in the city for he and Paddy Cairns were companions together in the old 8th Ward.

For a few semesters he attended college, studying engineering, but found no time for football or girls because he had to work seven nights a week in the local steel mill to pay a debt. His family background and lack of prep school education kept him from entering a fraternity in his youth. But as an adult, Warbucks joined the Freemasons and went on to serve as Worshipful Master of a lodge.

Career, family, and pursuits
He eventually became foreman in the rolling mill, married Mrs. Warbucks, worked and planned for a family and house of their own. When "Daddy" began to make big money during World War I, the marital happiness was lost, but he retained his identity with the common people.

After the war, Warbucks continued as an industrialist, but became a philanthropist as well—his fortune had built to "ten billion dollars". His wife instigated the taking in (no adoption ever took place) of Annie while Warbucks was away on a business trip. On his return, he was smitten with Annie and, as her father-figure, offered the girl support as needed. He often intervened in Annie's life during crisis, always returning in time to save the day.

During World War II, Warbucks, along with his bodyguards Punjab and The Asp, joined Allied forces. Warbucks became a three-star general.

He was knighted by the Queen of the United Kingdom later in life.

Views
Warbucks was often a platform for cartoonist Harold Gray's political views, which were free market-based, opposing the New Deal policies of the Democrats. He sometimes expounded on the need for wealthy men to work hard—lest the masses have no employment. At the same time, capitalists who underpaid or mistreated their workers were portrayed in a negative light, with corrupt businessmen often being shown as villains. In 1944, Gray briefly killed off Warbucks on the grounds that it was widely thought that capitalists were obsolete. Warbucks was resurrected, however, after FDR's death.

His portrayal in the 1977 stage musical and subsequent film adaptations differs from this, showing him as an associate of Franklin Delano Roosevelt, and embracing the New Deal. The musical (and Meehan's novelization of it) takes steps to reconcile this by explaining that Warbucks is a self-made self-reliant millionaire who prides himself on never asking anyone for help. The depression is eating into his financial empire and, although still a long way from poverty, he is lobbying Roosevelt to take steps to resolve the Depression. Warbucks is fiercely adamant that even this does not constitute asking for help; he lobbies on the basis that "if I'm not making money then no one is." Warbucks is finally forced to abandon his stance and ask Roosevelt for help when he needs to rapidly disprove the claim of "Ralph and Shirley Mudge" to be Annie's parents, which Roosevelt gives without reservation.

Portrayals in media
 Film versions of the Annie story appeared in 1932 and 1938. In the 1932 version, Warbucks was portrayed by Edgar Kennedy, however the 1938 version omits the character.
 In the 1970s, Warbucks became more widely known via the 1977 musical Annie on Broadway. These were followed in 1982 by the musical film Annie, in which Daddy Warbucks was portrayed by Albert Finney, who had shaved his head to play the role.
 George Hearn also shaved his head when he played the role in the 1995 sequel Annie: A Royal Adventure!.
 In Disney's 1999 made-for-TV version, Warbucks is portrayed by Victor Garber, who (like Finney and Hearn) shaved his head to prepare for his role.
 In the 2014 film adaptation, Warbucks' name has been changed to Will Stacks and he is portrayed by Jamie Foxx.
 Oliver Warbucks appears in the Drawn Together episode "Nipple Ring-Ring Goes to Foster Care". Annie warns Foxx that Daddy Warbucks will take out her eyes (a reference to how the characters are depicted without pupils).
 The father of antagonist Princess Morbucks from The Powerpuff Girls, referred to only as "Daddy" on-screen but as "King Morbucks" unofficially, would appear to be an amalgamation of Oliver Warbucks and Ernst Stavro Blofeld. His face and head are always hidden from the viewer from the shoulders up, and is usually seen wearing either a business suit or a smoking jacket, along with a lit cigar. Like Warbucks, he has access to a seemingly unlimited amount of money.
 In the popular TV show Breaking Bad (season 1 episode 5), Hank makes a reference to "Daddy" Warbucks being wealthy enough to pay for Walter's cancer treatment. Jesse also makes a passing reference to "Daddy" Warbucks when seeking money from Walter for housing (season 2 episode 4).
 Oliver Warbucks appears in the Robot Chicken episode "Tell My Mom", voiced by Seth MacFarlane. Stephen Stanton voices Oliver Warbucks in the episode "Maurice Was Caught" in the sketch "Annie's Super Sweet 16".
 The band Metric uses the name of this character in a song titled "Monster Hospital".
 Daniel Bedingfield used the name of this character in his song "James Dean (I Wanna Know)".
 In Poolhall Junkies, character "Joe" (played by Chazz Palminteri) refers to "Daddy Warbucks" when speaking of Christopher Walken's character "Mike". He is referring to Mike's wealth and ability to cover the main character, Johnny, and his bets on pool games. When offering to up a bet Joe says to Johnny: Why don't you speak to Daddy Warbucks and see how much it's worth?
 The character is referenced in the song "Daddy Warbux" by Anti-Flag on the album Underground Network.
 In the TV show Brooklyn Nine-Nine (season 2 episode 23), Charles Boyle recalls a screenwriter suing his high school's production of Annie, due to him as "Daddy" Warbucks 'full on making out' with the girl playing Annie, while on stage.
 In NBC's 2021 live musical, he was played by Harry Connick Jr.
 The character is referenced in the lyrics of The Diplomats song "I Really Mean It/Phone Skit #1" from their 2003 album Diplomatic Immunity (The Diplomats album).

References

External links
 Annie Comics

American comics characters
Fictional businesspeople
Fictional gentry
Fictional philanthropists
Fictional lords and ladies
Fictional people from Liverpool
Fictional immigrants to the United States
Fictional lieutenant generals
Fictional Republicans (United States)
Comics characters introduced in 1924
Male characters in comics
Little Orphan Annie
Dick Tracy characters